There are a number of landmarks, buildings, roads and parks named after the founder of Pakistan, Muhammad Ali Jinnah (also known as Quaid-e-Azam), as well as other items.  This is a list of all such notable items.

Buildings and structures
 Jinnah Antarctic Station
 Jinnah Convention Centre, Islamabad
 Jinnah Bridge, Karachi
 Jinnah International Airport, Karachi
 Jinnah Naval Base, Ormara, Balochistan
 Jinnah Barrage, Kalabagh
 Jinnah Sports Stadium, Islamabad
 Jinnah Stadium, Gujranwala
 Jinnah Stadium, Sialkot
 Quaid-e-Azam Library, Lahore
 Quaid-e-Azam Solar Park, Bahawalpur
 Quaid-e-Azam Stadium, Mirpur, Azad Kashmir
 Jinnah Auditorium, Bahauddin Zakariya University, Multan
 Jinnah Auditorium, National University of Sciences and Technology, Islamabad
 Jinnah Park, Sharqi Colony, Vehari
  Jinnah Park, Winnipeg, Canada
 Jinnah Park Rawalpindi
 Mohammed Ali Jinnah Memorial Mosque, Port of Spain, Trinidad and Tobago

Hospitals
 Jinnah Hospital, Kabul
 Jinnah Hospital, Karachi
 Jinnah Hospital, Lahore

Organisations
 Jinnah Institute

Landmarks
 Bagh-e-Jinnah, Karachi
 Jinnah Garden, Faisalabad
 Jinnah Park, Rawalpindi
 Bagh-e-Jinnah, Lahore
 Bagh-e-Quaid-e-Azam, Karachi
 Jinnah House, Mumbai
 Jinnah Tower, Guntur, Andhra Pradesh, India
 Muhammad Ali Jinnah House, Delhi
 Mazar-e-Quaid, Karachi
 Quaid-e-Azam House, Karachi
 Quaid-e-Azam Residency, Ziarat, Balochistan
 Quaid-e-Azam tourist lodge, Barsala, Muzaffarabad, Azad Kashmir
 Jinnah Bagh, larkana
 jinnah chowk, seoni India

Places
 Jinnah Colony, Faisalabad
 Jinnahabad, Abbottabad
 Jinnah Town, Sadiqabad

Political groups
 Pakistan Muslim League (Jinnah)
 Pakistan Muslim League (Quaid-e-Azam)

Roads
 Cinnah Caddesi, Ankara, Turkey
 Mohammad Ali Jenah Expressway, Tehran, Iran
 Mohammad Ali Janah Street, Amman, Jordan
 Muhammad Ali Jinnah Way, Coney Island Avenue, New York City, United States
 Muhammad Ali Jinnah Way, Devon Avenue, Chicago, United States
 Muhammad Ali Jinnah Road, Riyadh, Saudi Arabia
 Muhammad Ali Jinnah Road, Karachi
 Shahrah-e-Quaid-e-Azam, Lahore
 M A Jinnah road, Quetta
 M A Jinnah Road, Okara
 M A Jinnah Avenue, Blue Area, Islamabad
 Jinnah Close, Birmingham United Kingdom
 Jinnah Road, Redditch, Worcestershire, United Kingdom
 Jinnah Court in Bradford, United Kingdom

Sport
 Quaid-e-Azam Inter Provincial Youth Games
 Quaid-e-Azam Trophy, Pakistan's domestic first-class cricket championship

Things
 Jinnah cap
 Tamgha-e-Quaid-e-Azam

Educational institutes and research centers
 Jinnah College for Women, Peshawar
 Jinnah Medical College, Peshawar
 Jinnah Medical and Dental College, Karachi
 Jinnah Memorial College, Nowshera
 Jinnah Polytechnic Institute, Faisalabad
 Jinnah Sindh Medical University, Karachi
 Jinnah University for Women, Karachi
 Mohammad Ali Jinnah University, Karachi
 Quaid-e-Azam Law College, Sargodha
 Quaid-e-Azam Medical College, Bahawalpur
 Quaid-i-Azam University, Islamabad
Jinnah Antarctic Station south pole

See also
 Muhammad Ali Jinnah
 Jinnah family

References

Jinnah, structures
Named after
Jinnah, Muhammad Ali
Memorials to Muhammad Ali Jinnah